Tarbert is a hamlet on Tarbert Bay, on the east coast of the island of Jura, in the council area of Argyll and Bute, Scotland. There is the remains of a chapel that was dedicated to St Columba. Tarbert consists of 2 main areas, the area associated with Rubha nan Crann and the farm overlooking the bay.

History 
The name "Tarbert" means "The isthmus".

References 

Hamlets in Argyll and Bute
Villages on Jura, Scotland